Orsino may refer to:

 Orsino, Florida, United States
 Orsino (play), a play by Romain Rolland
 Orsino (Twelfth Night), a character in the Shakespearean comedy Twelfth Night
 Orsino, the name of an elven mage in Dragon Age II

People with the surname
 John Orsino (1938–2016), former Major League Baseball catcher
 Philip Orsino (born 1954), Canadian businessman

See also